Georges-Joseph Valade (25 March 1922 – 12 September 1997) was a Progressive Conservative party member of the House of Commons of Canada.

Valade was born in Baltimore, Maryland, where his father was employed as a typographer. He received a degree in pharmacy from the University of Montreal, and took further studies at St. Francis Xavier University. He was a pharmacist by career.

He was first elected at the Sainte-Marie riding in
the 1958 general election after two previous unsuccessful attempts to enter the House of Commons: in the 1953 election at Longueuil and in the 1957 election at Sainte-Marie.

Valade was re-elected at Sainte-Marie in the 1962, 1963, 1965, 1968 federal elections. After the 1968 election, he was the only remaining Progressive Conservative representative from Montreal.

He was defeated in the 1972 federal election by Raymond Dupont of the Liberal party. Another attempt to win the riding in the 1974 election was also unsuccessful. He died in Montreal in September 1997.

References

External links

George Valade's obituary 

1922 births
1997 deaths
American emigrants to Canada
Members of the House of Commons of Canada from Quebec
Politicians from Baltimore
Progressive Conservative Party of Canada MPs